IBC NewsBreak was the hourly news bulletin of Intercontinental Broadcasting Corporation. Its first incarnation is from March 9, 1992, to April 1, 1994, replacing Islands NewsBreak and was replaced by IBC Headliners and it returned from October 27, 2014, to February 9, 2018, replacing IBC Headliners.

Airing history
after Islands TV-13 reverted to IBC, airing from Monday to Sunday. After three years of hiatus, IBC revived its hourly news bulletin on October 27, 2014, using the original title. Initially, IBC Newsbreak airs only during the halftime and after PBA D-League broadcasts every Monday, Tuesday and Thursday at 9:00PM and 11:00PM, replacing the latenight edition of News Team 13 which was then-aired on Wednesday and Friday. A year later, IBC Newsbreak would become a permanent replacement to News Team 13 Latenight Edition and extends its broadcast from Monday to Friday.

Anchors

Final anchors
 Vincent Santos
 Greg Gregorio
 Kathleen Forbes

Former anchors
 Jess Caduco
 Czarinah Lusuegro

See also
 List of programs previously broadcast by Intercontinental Broadcasting Corporation
 News Team 13

Philippine television news shows
1990s Philippine television series
1992 Philippine television series debuts
1994 Philippine television series endings
2014 Philippine television series debuts
2018 Philippine television series endings
Intercontinental Broadcasting Corporation news shows
IBC News and Public Affairs
Intercontinental Broadcasting Corporation original programming
English-language television shows
Filipino-language television shows